Ralph Eustace Hemingway (15 December 1877 – 15 October 1915) was an English first-class cricketer active 1903–14 who played for Nottinghamshire. He was born in Macclesfield and was killed in France on active service during World War I.

References

1877 births
1915 deaths
Sportspeople from Macclesfield
English cricketers
Nottinghamshire cricketers
British military personnel killed in World War I
Gentlemen of the South cricketers
North v South cricketers